Celebes is the former name of Sulawesi, an island in Indonesia.

Celebes may also refer to:
 Celebes Sea, western Pacific Ocean
 Celebes TV, a local news television station in South Sulawesi, Indonesia
 The Elephant Celebes, a 1921 Surrealist work by Max Ernst
 HMS Celebes (1806), originally the Batavian Republic frigate Pallas
 Celebes papeda, Citrus celebica, a tree species native to Sulawesi

See also